Harry John Newman Treadaway (born 10 September 1984) is an English actor known for his performances as Victor Frankenstein in the horror-drama series Penny Dreadful and Brady Hartsfield in Audience's Mr. Mercedes.

Early life
Born at the Royal Devon and Exeter Hospital in Exeter, Devon, Treadaway was brought up in Sandford, Devon. His father is an architect and his mother is a primary school teacher; he has two brothers, older brother Sam (an artist) and twin Luke. Treadaway and his twin brother Luke attended Queen Elizabeth's Community College in Crediton, Devon, where they played in the twice Devon Cup winning Rugby Union team.

Inspired by a love of Eddie Vedder and with support from their secondary school drama teacher, the twins formed a band called Lizardsun. They also both joined the National Youth Theatre.

Career 
Treadaway's professional debut was Brothers of the Head, a feature film about conjoined twin brothers in a punk rock band. He played Tom Howe, the band's rhythm guitarist and songwriter, and his brother Luke played Barry Howe, the lead singer. During rehearsals and throughout the shoot, the brothers were connected to each other for fifteen hours a day, wearing sewn-together wetsuits or a harness. They also slept in one bed to simulate the conjoined nature of their characters. The Treadaways performed all tracks featured in the film themselves live on stage, as well as recording nine tracks for the sound-track album. He took time out from his course at LAMDA to work on Brothers of the Head and graduated in 2006.

Treadaway took on other professional commitments while still at drama school including Miss Marple: Sleeping Murder for ITV television, and a reading of a new play, Myrna Molloy, for Operating Theatre Company in 2006.

In Control, Treadaway played Joy Division drummer Stephen Morris. In 2008, he appears in the Channel 4 drama The Shooting of Thomas Hurndall and a short film by Sam Taylor-Wood.

He acted in the horror film The Disappeared, directed by Johnny Kevorkian, and science fiction-fantasy film City of Ember. He made his stage debut in Over There, a new play by Mark Ravenhill alongside his twin brother Luke at the Royal Court Theatre in 2009.

Treadaway is also credited as a songwriter, after writing the piece "Sink or Swim", which he and Luke performed both on film and on the soundtrack of Brothers of the Head. He also performed his song "Raise This Up" in "Brothers of the Head" as a solo performance during the scene in which Tom Howe's girlfriend breaks his heart.

In 2011, he appeared in The Last Furlong, filmed in Ireland. He starred as title character James Furlong.

He played Victor Frankenstein in the Showtime TV series Penny Dreadful, starting in May 2014.

In 2016, he was cast as one of the leads in Audience's Mr. Mercedes, based on the novel of the same name, opposite Brendan Gleeson. His part was that of Brady Hartsfield, a brilliant young psychopath who decides to engage in a cat-and-mouse game with Gleeson's Bill Hodges. Anton Yelchin had originally been given the role of Hartsfield, but following Yelchin's death in June 2016, it was announced that his role had been recast with Treadaway assuming the part. In 2018, he reprised the role in the show's second season.

Treadaway played Roddy Llewellyn in the third series of Netflix's The Crown. He portrays the Romulan Narek in the first season of CBS All Access's Star Trek: Picard.

Filmography

Film

Television

Awards and nominations

References

External links

1984 births
Living people
British identical twins
People from Mid Devon District
English twins
National Youth Theatre members
Alumni of the London Academy of Music and Dramatic Art
English male film actors
English male television actors
Identical twin male actors
21st-century English male actors
Male actors from Devon